North Main Street Historic District is a national historic district located at Graham, Alamance County, North Carolina. It encompasses 72 contributing buildings and 1 contributing structure in the central business district of Graham.  The district includes a variety of institutional, commercial, and residential buildings largely dating from the 19th century.  Notable buildings include the Alamance County Courthouse, the centerpiece of the district; Graham Presbyterian Church; Harden House; Hunter House; Nicks Store; McBride Holt House (c. 1885); Scott Building (c. 1900); Vestal Hotel; Holt-Scott General·Store (c. 1850-1860); National Bank of Alamance (c. 1906); Mont-White Theatre; and Paris Building (c. 1912).

It was added to the National Register of Historic Places in 1983.

References

Historic districts on the National Register of Historic Places in North Carolina
Historic districts in Alamance County, North Carolina
National Register of Historic Places in Alamance County, North Carolina